Honduras is a country in Central America. It may also refer to:

 Honduras, Indiana, United States
 Honduras, Barranquitas, Puerto Rico
 Honduras, Cidra, Puerto Rico
 British Honduras, the previous name of Belize